Chittenango Pottery is a historic pottery located at Chittenango, Madison County, New York. The site includes two large brick buildings that were constructed in 1898-1899 for the Chittenango Pottery Company.

It was listed on the National Register of Historic Places in 2009.

Their website is www.chittenangopottery.com

References

External links

Industrial buildings and structures on the National Register of Historic Places in New York (state)
Industrial buildings completed in 1899
1899 establishments in New York (state)
National Register of Historic Places in Madison County, New York